Quesada is a Spanish toponymic surname originating from the town of Quesada in Jaén, Andalucia. It was originally the surname of the nobility of the town of Quesada. It is also briefly mentioned in the tale of Don Quixote as a possible alternate surname for the title character. The name was also used by the Moors at the time.

History
This surname was first recorded during the 1240s AD, in a manuscript about Ferdinand III of Castile's army recapturing Seville.

People
 Alfredo Quesada (born 1949), Peruvian football player
 Alfredo De Quesada, Puerto Rican actor
 Carlos Manuel de Céspedes y Quesada (1871–1939), Cuban writer, politician, diplomat, and sixth President of Cuba
 Carlos Alvarado Quesada (born 1980), President of Costa Rica (2018-2022)
 Carlos Quesada (born 1985), Costa Rican basketball player
 Diego Camacho Quesada (born 1976), Spanish footballer
 Elwood Richard Quesada (1904–1993), American administrator and air force general, later owned 1961 Washington Senators
 Francisco Miró Quesada Cantuarias (1918-2019), Peruvian philosopher
 Francisco Morazán Quesada (1792–1842), President of Central America
 Gaspar de Quesada (died April 7 1520), participant in Magellan's voyage
 Gonzalo Quesada (born 1974), Argentine rugby player
 Gonzalo Jiménez de Quesada (1506–1579), Spanish explorer and conquistador
 Jenaro Quesada, 1st Marquis of Miravalles (1818–1889), Spanish soldier
 Joe Quesada (born 1962), editor-in-chief of Marvel Comics
 José Martín Quesada (1935–1996), Spanish cyclist
 Juan Rafael Elvira Quesada (born 1956), Mexican politician
 Nya Quesada (1919−2013), Argentine actress
 Odette Quesada (born TBA), Filipina singer
 Omar Quesada (born 1965), a Peruvian lawyer and politician
 Salvador Quesada (1886-1971), Olympic fencer
 Vicente Fox Quesada (born 1942), former President of Mexico
 Vicente Quesada (1812–1877), Chilean lawyer and lawmaker, father of Jenaro Quesada
 Yoelbi Quesada (born 1973), Cuban athlete in the triple jump

References 

Spanish-language surnames